Litherland REMYCA Football Club is a football club based in Litherland, Merseyside, England.

History
The club was established in 1959 as St Thomas Football Club and were initially based in Seaforth. They were later renamed Bootle Church Lads Brigade, with Bootle YMCA becoming the club's base. In 1967 they became REM Social after a local working men's club started financing the club, before being renamed REMYCA United the following year, the name reflecting links with the REM social club and the Bootle YMCA. Under the new name the club joined Division Three of the I Zingari Alliance, winning it at the first attempt. After winning higher divisions in successive seasons, the club entered the I Zingari League.

The 1975–76 season saw REMYCA win the league's Challenge Cup, and the club were league champions in 1987–88. In 1990–91 they won the Lancashire Amateur Cup. The mid-1990s were a highly-successful period for the club as they won both the league title and the Challenge Cup in three successive seasons between 1993–94 and 1995–96, before winning the Challenge Cup again in 1998–99. In 2001 they joined the newly re-established Division Two of the Liverpool County Combination. The two divisions merged into one the following season, but the club withdrew from the league midway through the 2002–03 season.

REMYCA returned to the I Zingari League and were Division Two champions in 2005–06. The league then merged with the Liverpool County Combination to form the Liverpool County Premier League, with the club placed in Division Two. They won the division in the league's inaugural season and were promoted to Division One. After a third-place finish in 2009–10 the club were promoted to the Premier Division. In 2013 they were renamed Litherland REMYCA. A fifth-place finish in the Premier Division in 2013–14 was enough to earn promotion to Division One of the North West Counties League.

In 2016–17 Litherland finished third in Division One, qualifying for the promotion play-offs; after beating Sandbach United 1–0 in the semi-finals, they lost 3–0 at home to City of Liverpool in the final in front of a record crowd of 1,303.

Ground
The club played at Moss Lane until moving to Maghull High School when they joined the Premier Division of the I Zingari League. They later move to their current ground, the Litherland Sports Park athletics arena. A 50-seat stand was installed in April 2014.

Honours
Liverpool County Premier League
Division Two champions 2006–07
I Zingari League
Champions 1987–88, 1993–94, 1994–95, 1995–96
Challenge Cup winners 1975–76, 1993–94, 1994–95, 1995–96, 1998–99
Division Two champions 2005–06
I Zingari Alliance
Division Three champions 1968–69
Lancashire Amateur Cup
Winners 1990–91

Records
Best FA Cup performance: First round qualifying, 2020–21
Best FA Vase performance: First round, 2016–17, 2017–18
Record attendance: 1,303 vs City of Liverpool, North West Counties League Division One play-off final, 13 May 2017

See also
Litherland REMYCA F.C. players

References

External links

Football clubs in England
Football clubs in Merseyside
Association football clubs established in 1959
1959 establishments in England
Sport in the Metropolitan Borough of Sefton
Fan-owned football clubs in England
I Zingari League
Liverpool County Football Combination
Liverpool County Premier League
North West Counties Football League clubs
Sports clubs founded by the YMCA